Saman-Depe Gas Field is a large natural gas field located in Lebap Province of Turkmenistan. The field belongs to contractual territory Bagtyyarlyk, a group of several fields on the right bank of Amu Darya River the maximum output of which is estimated at 25-30 billion cubic meters per year, combined. The peak of production is expected in 2015–2020. As per initial estimates, the fields will produce approximately 12 billion cubic meters in 2010. Saman-Depe along with Altyn-Asyr are considered to be the largest fields in the area. In total, there are 17 gas and gas condensate fields on the right bank of Amu Darya: 
Saman-Depe, Farap (both in development stage); 
Metedzhan, Kishtivan, Sandykty (all three being preserved), 
Akgumalam, Tangiguyi, Ildzhik, Yanguyi, Chashguyi, Girsan, Beshir, Bota, Uzyngyi, Bereketli, Pirgyi (all in exploration stage)
CNPC will also be repairing nearly 50 wells prepared by Turkmen specialists in 1980's. 
In December 2009, Presidents of Turkmenistan, China, Uzbekistan and Kazakhstan inaugurated the Turkmenistan-China gas pipeline and commencement of gas processing plant in Saman-Depe. Additionally, the plant will produce nearly 180,000 tonnes of stable condensate at full capacity. The construction of the facility was subcontracted to Sofregaz and Technip.

See also

Bagtyýarlyk
Central Asia – China gas pipeline
Ýolöten Gas Field
Dauletabad gas field

References

Natural gas fields in Turkmenistan
Energy in Central Asia